Phyllonorycter enchalcoa is a moth of the family Gracillariidae. It is known from Tasmania.

The larvae feed on Plagianthus sidoides. They probably mine the leaves of their host plant.

References

enchalcoa
Moths of Australia
Moths described in 1939